The 1901–02 season was the 31st season of competitive football in England.

League changes
Doncaster Rovers and Bristol City replaced Walsall and New Brighton Tower in the Football League.

Burton United were formed by a merger of Burton Swifts  with former League side Burton Wanderers.

Bristol City were the first non-London Southern side in the league.

Events

 9 January 1902 – Newton Heath, the Manchester based Second Division club, are on the brink of closure and expulsion from the Football League after being issued with a winding up order. The club is £2,600 in debt.
 28 April 1902 – Newton Heath, after being saved by new owner John Henry Davies, are renamed Manchester United.

Honours

Notes = Number in parentheses is the times that club has won that honour. * indicates new record for competition

Football League

First Division

Second Division

References